The Ministry of Environment, Water and Forests is one of the ministries of the Government of Romania. It was created in 1991. The institution was known as the Ministry of Environment and Waters Management before April 2007; and then the Ministry of Environment and Forests.

Ministers

References

External links
Ministry of Environment

External links
 MMGA.ro
 GUV.ro

Environment and Climate Change
Romania
Romania, Environment and Climate Change
Romania
Forestry in Romania
1991 establishments in Romania